Benauli is a town and Village Development Committee  in Bara District in the Narayani Zone of south-eastern Nepal. At the time of the 1991 Nepal census it had a population of 5110 persons living in 659 individual households.

Ward No. 7 
Ward Office: - Benauli

Includes Vdc: - Benauli (Ward 1 - 9)

Total Area: - 7.62 (Square K.M.)

Total Population: - 5110 (2011)

Ward Contact Person Name, Post, and Contact

References

External links
UN map of the municipalities of Bara District

Populated places in Bara District